The 2007–08 Duke Blue Devils men's basketball team represented Duke University. The head coach was Mike Krzyzewski, serving for his 28th year. The team played its home games in Cameron Indoor Stadium in Durham, North Carolina.  The team finished with a 28–6 (13–3) record, while making it to the second round of the NCAA tournament.  Senior DeMarcus Nelson was the sole senior and captain for the 2007–2008 squad, starting at shooting guard. Junior Greg Paulus (point guard), sophomores Gerald Henderson, Jr. (guard/forward) and Lance Thomas (forward), and freshman Kyle Singler (forward) rounded out the rest of the starting lineup. Jon Scheyer (shooting guard) served as the sixth man, playing significant minutes off the bench.

Recruiting

Roster

Rankings

Schedule

|-
!colspan=9 style=| Exhibition

|-
!colspan=9 style=|Regular Season

|-
!colspan=12 style=| ACC Tournament

|-
!colspan=12 style=| NCAA tournament

Accomplishments
15–1 record at home
Ranked as high as #2 in the AP poll
Began ACC with 10–0 record
8–3 record vs. teams in the NCAA tournament field during the regular season
4–2 record vs. ranked teams
ACC honors:
DeMarcus Nelson was first team All-ACC and ACC Defensive Player of the Year
Kyle Singler was third team All-ACC and ACC Rookie of the Year

References 

Duke
Duke Blue Devils men's basketball seasons
Duke
Duke
Duke